Kulai railway station is a train station located in the city of Kulai, Johor, Malaysia. The station is located in heart of Kulai town, and is accessible to every location in town within walking distance.

The Kulai railway station is within walking distance of the Kulai Bus Terminal. The station provides KTM Intercity train services.

See also
 Rail transport in Malaysia

External links
 Kulai KTM Railway Station 

KTM ETS railway stations
Kulai District
Railway stations in Johor